Lt. Col. Ernest Missett (ca.1765 – 22 September 1820) was the British consul-general in Egypt from 1803 to 1816. He was instrumental in consulting with the Mamelukes during the Battle of Rosetta.

See also 

 History of Egypt under the British

References 

British consuls-general in Egypt

Year of birth missing
1820 deaths